Astrid Villaume (3 November 1923 – 12 February 1995) was a Danish actress of stage and film best known for her Bodil Award-winning title role in the 1950 film Susanne. Danish film historian Morten Piil described Villaume's appeal as a combination of "warm mother figure, romantic heroine and innocent erotic dream girl."

Early life 
Astrid Villaume, the daughter of a pharmacist, was born 3 November 1923 in Aalestrup near Viborg, Denmark. While in her late teens, Villaume performed as an acrobat in Danish revues. She attended the drama school at the Odense Theater from 1939 to 1941, and made her debut on stage there in the play Under Krigen (English: In The War). She enjoyed success as a stage actress during the next six years, however she applied to return to the drama school at the Det Kongelige Teater (Royal Danish Theatre) in 1947. After an audition, she was accepted and attended classes another two years. When asked why she would want to attend drama school twice, Villaume said simply, "Because I thought I needed it."

Career 
She debuted at the Royal Danish Theatre in the role of Stine Isenkræmmer in Barselsstuen and from July 1949 Villaume was permanently employed there. Over the years she performed a variety of roles including Mary Tyrone in Long Days Journey into Night, the title role in Anna Sophie Hedvig, Magdalone in Mascarade, and Linda Loman in Death of a Salesman. Villaume also enjoyed great popularity as a film actress. For her first leading role, as the beautiful baker's daughter in the 1950 film Susanne, Villaume was awarded the Bodil for Best Actress. Villaume went on to perform in 39 films as well as television and radio; one of her films, Qivitoq, was nominated for the Academy Award for Best Foreign Film.  She also provided the voices for the Danish language versions of Disney's Alice in Wonderland and Peter Pan.

Personal life 
Villaume married the businessman Carl Magnus von Staffeldt on 11 February 1947. Her husband died in 1959 while she was pregnant with their third child. Astrid Villaume died on 12 February 1995 at the age of 71. She was buried in the Frederiksberg Churchyard in Copenhagen.

Filmography 

 Pas på svinget i Solby – 1940
 Tyrannens fald – 1942
  – 1946
  – 1946
 Susanne – 1950
  – 1951
  – 1951
 Vi arme syndere – 1952
 To minutter for sent – 1952
 Adam og Eva – 1953
 Hejrenæs – 1953
 Arvingen – 1954
 Der kom en dag – 1955
 På tro og love – 1955
  – 1955
 Qivitoq – 1956
 Flintesønnerne – 1956
  – 1957
  – 1958
 Vagabonderne på Bakkegården – 1958
 Det skete på Møllegården – 1960
 Flemming og Kvik – 1960
  – 1961
 Der brænder en ild – 1962
 Det stod i avisen – 1962
  – 1963
  – 1964
 Gift – 1966
 Der var engang en krig – 1966
 Brødrene på Uglegården – 1967
  – 1969
  – 1969
 De fem i fedtefadet – 1970
  – 1975
  – 1980
  – 1982
 Pelle the Conqueror – 1987
 Lad isbjørnene danse – 1990

Awards 
 Bodil Award (1951)
 Ole Haslunds legat
 Poul Reumerts legat
 Henkel-prisen (1972)
 Tagea Brandts Rejselegat
 Olaf Poulsens Mindelegat
 Johanne Louise Heibergs Legat

References

External links 
 
 
 

1923 births
1995 deaths
20th-century Danish actresses
Best Actress Bodil Award winners
Danish film actresses
Danish stage actresses
Danish television actresses
Danish voice actresses
People from Vesthimmerland Municipality